Mehnagar is a town and a nagar panchayat in Azamgarh district in the Indian state of Uttar Pradesh.

Geography
It has an average elevation of 61 metres (200 feet).

Demographics
As of the 2001 Census of India, Mehnagar had a population of 13,319. Males constitute 52% of the population and females 48%. Mehnagar has an average literacy rate of 63%, higher than the national average of 59.5%: male literacy is 72%, and female literacy is 53%. In Mehnagar, 18% of the population is under 6 years of age.

See also
Dewait
Lakhansipur

References

Cities and towns in Azamgarh district